Amin Pourali (born 12 April 1988) is an Iranian professional footballer who plays as a defensive midfielder for Persian Gulf Pro League club Gol Gohar.

References

External links
 

1988 births
Living people
Iranian footballers
Association football midfielders
PAS Hamedan F.C. players
Aluminium Arak players
Persian Gulf Pro League players
Sportspeople from Gilan province